The Zurich Chamber Singers are a vocal ensemble from Zurich, Switzerland.

The ensemble was founded in 2015 by the pianist and conductor Christian Erny.

The Zurich Chamber Singers currently have around 35 members in their pool of singers, most of whom come from Switzerland. Other singers come from Germany, the United States, France, and Brazil. The size of the choir is flexible and varies depending on the project, from an octet to a full concert choir.

Work
The ensemble is dedicated to choral literature from all epochs, with a strong focus on promoting young composers. To date, the Zurich Chamber Singers have performed world premieres and other works by contemporary composers such as Kevin Hartnett (U. S.), Patrick Brennan (U. K.), Rhiannon Randle (U. K.), Marcus Paus (Norway) and Jaakko Mäntyjärvi (Finland). Their concert programs are mostly themed and combine traditional vocal music with contemporary compositions.

The Zurich Chamber Singers collaborated with ensembles such as the Musikkollegium Winterthur and the Orchestra of Europe. In 2019 they were guests at the Brahms Festival Winterthur, which was carried out by the Musikkollegium.

The debut CD Passio (Ars production), released in 2018, helped the ensemble to gain international media attention. The album, which combines passion music from the Renaissance, the Baroque and the present, received a positive response from BBC Music Magazine, the Swiss Kulturtipp and the Spanish magazine RITMO. At the Opus Klassik 2019 the record was nominated in the category choral work recording of the year. The choir has been exclusively under contract with the Berlin Classics label since 2020.

References

Culture of Zürich
Vocal ensembles
Swiss choirs
Musical groups established in 2015
2015 establishments in Switzerland